Southern School may refer to:
 Southern School of Chinese painting
 Southern School of Chan Buddhism